The National Social Norms Resource Center (NSNRC) is an independent American organization that promotes the use of the social norms approach (often called the social norms marketing approach) to reducing a wide range of health, safety and justice issues. 

Although the social norms approach has most widely been used to reduce both the consumption and the abuse of alcohol in education environments, the NSNRC also promotes its application to reduce tobacco use, violence and other social problems. To this end, it provides technical assistance in the application of social norm techniques. 

NSNRC, based at University of Virginia, is funded by Anheuser Busch.

Publications

 The social norms approach to preventing school and college age substance abuse : a handbook for educators, counselors, and clinicians / H. Wesley Perkins, editor. 1st ed. San Francisco : Jossey-Bass, c2003. xvi, 320 p. : ill. ; 24 cm.  (alk. paper)

External links
National Social Norms Resource Center
Addiction organizations in the United States
University of Virginia
Psychology organizations based in the United States